This list of the indigenous names of the Eastern Caribbean islands is a compilation of the indigenous names that were given by Amerindian people to those islands before the Europeans started naming them. The islands of the Eastern Caribbean were successively settled beginning with Trinidad at least around 5000 BC, long before European arrival in 1492. The Eastern Caribbean islands were dominated by two main cultural groups by the European contact period: the Arawaks and the Kalinago. Individual villages of other distinct cultural groups were also present on the more southerly, larger islands. The large island of Trinidad in particular was shared by both Kalinago and Arawak groups.

Archaeological evidence suggests that the Arawaks arrived first, settling the islands as they travelled north from the Orinoco River in Venezuela. The Kalinago people, who proved to be more dominant in warfare, had begun a campaign of conquering and displacement of the Arawaks at the point of European arrival. Also starting at the southern end of the archipelago, they had worked their way north, reaching as far as the island of Saint Kitts by the 16th century.

The islands north of the Saint Kitts 'borderline' had Arawak names while the islands south of it had Kalinago names. The island of Barbados was uninhabited at the point of European arrival, but evidence suggests that Barbados followed the same pattern of displacement as witnessed on neighbouring islands, but that it was abandoned for unknown reasons. The only indigenous name on record for Barbados is one documented as the name used by Arawak peoples on Trinidad in reference to that island.

Leeward Islands

Windward Islands

Continental

Greater Antilles

See also
Guianas

References

 

 

 
Caribbean Island Names
Caribbean Island Names
Caribbean culture
Indigenous Names
Indigenous Names
Indigenous Names